Karabunar is a village in located in the Septemvri Municipality of Pazardzhik Province, Bulgaria.

References

Villages in Pazardzhik Province